Hezekiah Ranney Dewey (April 14, 1838?) was a Michigan politician.

Early life
Dewey was born on April 14, 1838 in Rochester, New York.

Career
Dewey was a farmer for most of his life. On November 6, 1888, Dewey was elected to the Michigan House of Representatives where he represented the Genesee County 1st district from January 2, 1889 to December 31, 1890. Dewey was a Republican.

References

1838 births
Farmers from Michigan
Politicians from Rochester, New York
People from Genesee County, Michigan
Republican Party members of the Michigan House of Representatives
19th-century American politicians
Year of death missing